Nikolai Ulyanov can also refer to Vladimir Lenin

Nikolai Pavlovich Ulyanov (– 5 May 1949) was a Russian painter, scenic designer, and graphic artist.

Gallery

Sources

Biography
Global Performing Arts Database entry
 Soi͡uz pisateleĭ SSSR. 1979. Soviet Literature, Issues 9-12. Foreign Languages Publishing House.

19th-century painters from the Russian Empire
Russian male painters
20th-century Russian painters
Russian scenic designers
Soviet painters
1877 births
1949 deaths
19th-century male artists from the Russian Empire
20th-century Russian male artists